Cotylidia is a fungal genus characterized by small to moderately sized, white to palely  yet brightly colored, stalked, fan-shaped to funnel-shaped fruit bodies  with a smooth to wrinkled hymenium, tissues composed of monomitic hyphae, basidia producing smooth, nonamyloid spores, the absence of clamp connections, and bearing projecting cylindrical, thin-walled, hymenial cystidia. The genus is classified in the Hymenochaetales, however the type species, C. undulata has not yet been sequenced. Phylogenetically-related agaricoid fungi to the two species of Cotylidia thus far sequenced are in the genera Rickenella, Contumyces, Gyroflexus, Loreleia, Cantharellopsis and Blasiphalia, and  Muscinupta and the clavarioid genus, Alloclavaria.

The ecological status of Cotylidia remains unresolved. They fruit on soil or plant debris, sometimes on burn sites or among bryophytes. The culture characteristics are unknown.

Etymology

The generic name is derived from Greek and means "small cup" in reference to the fluted glass shape.

Species
, Species Fungorum accepts 12 species of Cotylidia.
Cotylidia aurantiaca 
Cotylidia carpatica 
Cotylidia decolorans 
Cotylidia diaphana 
Cotylidia guttulata 
Cotylidia harmandii 
Cotylidia komabensis 
Cotylidia marsicana 
Cotylidia muscigena 
Cotylidia pannosa 
Cotylidia pusiola 
Cotylidia undulata

References

Repetobasidiaceae
Agaricomycetes genera
Taxa described in 1881
Taxa named by Petter Adolf Karsten